Costelytra is a genus of beetles belonging to the family Scarabaeidae.

The species of this genus are found in New Zealand.

Species:

Costelytra austrobrunneum 
Costelytra brookesi 
Costelytra brooksei 
Costelytra brunneum 
Costelytra distincta 
Costelytra diurna 
Costelytra giveni 
Costelytra gregoryi 
Costelytra macrobrunneum 
Costelytra piceobrunneum 
Costelytra pseudobrunneum 
Costelytra symmetrica 
Costelytra zealandica

References

Melolonthinae
Scarabaeidae genera